Duck Dodgers in the th Century (spoken as "twenty-fourth-and-a-half") is a 1953 Warner Bros. Merrie Melodies cartoon directed by Chuck Jones. The cartoon was released on July 25, 1953, and stars Daffy Duck as space hero Duck Dodgers, Porky Pig as his assistant, and Marvin the Martian as his opponent. This cartoon marked the first of many appearances of the Duck Dodgers character.

Marvin the Martian had been introduced as an unnamed villain in Warner's cartoon Haredevil Hare (1948), playing opposite Bugs Bunny (Marvin wouldn't receive his proper name until 1979). He was later given the title 'Commander, Flying Saucer X-2' in 1952's The Hasty Hare. The Duck Dodgers cartoon is an extended parody of the pulp magazine, newspaper comic strip, and comic book character Buck Rogers, and his longtime run of space adventures, Buck Rogers in the 25th Century.

In 1994, Duck Dodgers was voted #4 of The 50 Greatest Cartoons of all time by members of the animation field. Because he was such a fan of the short in particular, Star Wars creator George Lucas requested that the short be shown before the original Star Wars film during its initial run in theaters. In 2004 at the 62nd World Science Fiction Convention, it was retrospectively nominated for a Retro Hugo Award for Best Dramatic Presentation—Short Form.

Plot
The film is set in the 24th century. The story begins with Duck Dodgers (Daffy) being tasked with locating the uncharted "Planet X", the only known remaining source for the dwindling element Illudium Phosdex, "the shaving cream atom". After a few small mishaps, Dodgers and his assistant, the "Eager Young Space Cadet" (Porky) set off by rocket. Once in flight, Dodgers plots what becomes an enormously complicated and inefficient course to Planet X, whereas the Cadet suggests a much simpler route, following a path of nearby planets bearing the letters of the alphabet (in order from A onward). After scoffing at the idea, Dodgers suddenly comes up with the same idea and takes credit for it. The ship then flies past the lettered planets and eventually arrives on Planet X.

Dodgers immediately claims the planet in the name of the Earth, but is quickly greeted by Marvin the Martian, as he claims it in the name of Mars. This has the two engage in a battle of wits (or lack thereof), with Dodgers getting shot multiple times in the face and disintegrated (and reintegrated) once. The battle continues through most of the film, until Dodgers finally declares enough is enough, and deploys his "secret weapon" that surrounds Marvin's ship with explosives. Marvin deploys the same type of weapon against Dodgers' ship.

When the two simultaneously detonate their weapons, the entire planet is destroyed, save for a small chunk. Dodgers pushes Marvin off this chunk, and once again claims it in his own name, as the Cadet and Marvin are seen hanging from a root underneath the chunk. The film closes with the Cadet saying "Eh-b-b-b-big deal."

Cast
Mel Blanc as Duck Dodgers, Porky Pig, Marvin the Martian and Dr. I.Q.Hi

Credits
The cartoon was directed by Chuck Jones (credited as Charles M. Jones), with the story by Michael Maltese, voices by Mel Blanc, and original music by Carl Stalling. The animation was credited to Lloyd Vaughan, Ken Harris and Ben Washam, with Harry Love receiving a credit for effects animation. The distinctive layouts were designed by Maurice Noble and the backgrounds produced by Phil DeGuard.

Uncredited are Stalling's quotations of "Powerhouse" and "Egyptian Barn Dance" (in the opening credits), by Raymond Scott.

Production
Jones saw Porky Pig's sidekick role as set apart from Daffy as the hero: "I always felt that Porky Pig was the subtlest of all the characters because he was consciously playing a part. He's obviously putting Daffy on, but it's a very subtle thing. In Duck Dodgers in the th Century, he was playing the space cadet, but he was aware that he was playing it. He was like I would be in a class play — in which the hero really thought he was the character."

Reception
Comic book writer Mark Evanier writes, "Director Chuck Jones and writer Mike Maltese inverted the usual cartoon convention of having the hero conquer the villain. Here, Daffy pretty much conquers himself with faulty disintegration rays and faultier personal swagger. As with the other times Jones handled the duck, the Oliver Hardy principle prevails: The joke is never the destruction that befalls the luckless character but their loss of dignity afterward."

Sequels and related media

Duck Dodgers and the Return of the 24½th Century (1980)
Tiny Toon Adventures: "Duck Dodgers Jr.", segment in the episode "The Return of the Acme Acres Zone" (1990)
Marvin the Martian in the Third Dimension (1996), a 3-D cartoon
Superior Duck (1996)
Attack of the Drones (2003)
Duck Dodgers (2003–2005), television series on Cartoon Network

Home media
This cartoon is available on Disc 2 of Volume 1 of the Looney Tunes Golden Collection and on Disc 2 of the Looney Tunes Platinum Collection: Volume 1 Blu-ray box set, with the cartoon restored in high definition, as well as Disc 1 of The Essential Daffy Duck. The short will be included as a bonus feature on the Duck Dodgers: The Complete Series Blu-ray set.

In popular culture

The cartoon can be seen in the background of one scene in Steven Spielberg's film Close Encounters of the Third Kind (1977).

In the Season One episode of the 1990s hit science fiction TV series Babylon 5 entitled Midnight on the Firing Line, the head of security Michael Garibaldi invites the Minbari ambassador  Delenn to his quarters with him, where they share popcorn and a night of watching Duck Dodgers, although the comedy is lost on her. Daffy Duck is Michael Garibaldi's favorite cartoon character.

See also
Buck Rogers in the 25th Century
List of cartoons featuring Daffy Duck
List of Marvin the Martian cartoons
List of cartoons featuring Porky Pig

References

External links

Duck Dodgers in the th Century at Don Markstein's Toonopedia. Archived from the original on May 5, 2016.

1953 animated films
1953 films
1953 short films
1950s science fiction comedy films
1950s parody films
American animated science fiction films
American parody films
Animated films about extraterrestrial life
Duck Dodgers
Films set on fictional planets
Mars in film
Short films directed by Chuck Jones
Daffy Duck films
Marvin the Martian films
Porky Pig films
Films set in the future
Merrie Melodies short films
Films scored by Carl Stalling
American science fiction comedy films
Films with screenplays by Michael Maltese
1950s English-language films
1950s Warner Bros. animated short films
Films set in the 24th century